Arthur French fitz Geoffrey, Mayor of Galway, 1539–40.

French replaced Arthur Lynch fitz Andrew who had died while in office. Unlike other mayoral replacements, French never served as Mayor in his own right. The bailiffs, Andrew Lynch fitz Stephen and James Oge Lynch, do not appear to have been replaced. Legislation enacted during his term made legal the provision that widows were entitled to a third of their husband's possessions at the time of his death.

See also

 Mayor of Galway
 The Tribes of Galway

References
History of Galway, James Hardiman, Galway, 1820.
Old Galway, Maureen Donovan O'Sullivan, 1942.
Henry, William (2002). Role of Honour: The Mayors of Galway City 1485-2001. Galway: Galway City Council.  
 Martyn, Adrian (2016). The Tribes of Galway: 1124-1642

Politicians from County Galway
16th-century Irish businesspeople
Mayors of Galway
16th-century Irish politicians
Year of death unknown
Year of birth unknown